Heymard Emanuel Humblers Samayoa (born 9 March 1993) is a Guatemalan badminton player.

Achievements

BWF International Challenge/Series 
Men's singles

Men's doubles

Mixed doubles

  BWF International Challenge tournament
  BWF International Series tournament
  BWF Future Series tournament

References

External links 
 

1993 births
Living people
People from Baja Verapaz Department
Guatemalan male badminton players
Badminton players at the 2011 Pan American Games
Badminton players at the 2015 Pan American Games
Pan American Games competitors for Guatemala